Kim Han-jung is a South Korean politician serving as a member of the 20th and 21st National Assembly (Two-Term Member, Democratic Party of Korea Representative for Gyeonggi Province, Namyangju City, 2nd District).

Kim Han-jung began his political career as press secretary to Kim Dae-jung, the then leader of the Democratic Party of Korea (DPK). After Kim Dae-jung was elected to the presidency Kim Han-jung served as his Chief Private Presidential Secretary, assisting in the arrangement and execution of the historic inter-Korean summit of 2000, for which President Kim was awarded the 2000 Nobel Peace Prize. Kim Han-jung continued to support President Kim’s efforts toward international peace and diplomacy in the capacity of Chief of Staff to the President.

Kim currently holds position on the Trade, Industry, Energy, SMES, and Startups Committee, in addition to the offices of President of the National Assembly’s Peace Forum on the Korean Peninsula and Standing Secretary of the Korea-Japan Parliamentarians’Union. Kim also serves on the frontline of parliamentary diplomacy toward China and the US as a member of the DPK Korean Peninsula Taskforce, as well as playing a pivotal advisory role in the establishment of foreign policy in the present administration as the chair of the Committee on International Affairs of the DPK, currently the ruling party of Korea.

In September 2021, he paid a visit to Washington, D.C. in the capacity of Senior Advisor on Foreign Policy to Lee Jae-myung, the DPK nominee for the 2022 South Korean Presidential Election.
During his first term at the 20th National Assembly, Kim took on active roles in the National Assembly Special Committee on Inter-Korean Economic Cooperation and, drawing upon his expertise in the fields of inter-Korean relations, foreign affairs, and national security. He also held the positions of deputy floor leader for policy and Special Advisor on Foreign Affairs and Security to the floor leader of the DPK.

In July 2018 Kim visited Pyongyang as the Executive Committee Chair of the Korean Council for Reconciliation and Cooperation, and in October of the same year paid a follow-up visit to the United States as a diplomatic envoy for the DPK, looking to obtain international cooperation in building upon the foundation laid by the Pyongyang Inter-Korean Summit.

Education 
Kim Han-jung graduated from the International Economics Department of Seoul National University, and completed a Ph.D. in international politics at Rutgers University. He has further pursued his study of US-North Korean relations as a visiting scholar in Cornell University’s East Asia Program, and as a lecturer on East Asian Studies at Yonsei University.

Career 
2016–Present: Member of the 20th and 21st National Assembly (Two-Term Member, Democratic Party of Korea Representative for Gyeonggi Namyangju City)
2022–Present: Vice Chairperson, Trade, Industry, Energy, SMES, and Startups Committee, the National Assembly
2021–Present: Chair, Committee on International Affairs, Democratic Party of Korea
2020–Present: Standing secretary of the Korea-Japan Parliamentarians' Union 
2020–Present: President of the National Assembly's Peace Forum on the Korean Peninsula
2020–2022: Member of the National Policy Committee,the National Assembly
2021–2022: Member of the Special Committee on Budget & Accounts, the National Assembly
2020–2021: Head of the COVID-19 National Crisis Management Division, Democratic Party of Korea
2020–2021: Chief vice president of the policy committee, Democratic Party of Korea
2020: Member of the Korean Peninsula Task Force, Democratic Party of Korea
2018–Present: Vice chairperson, Special Committee for the Denuclearization of the Korean Peninsula, Democratic Party of Korea
2018 – 2020: Member of the Public Administration and Security Committee, National Assembly
2018 – 2019: Member, Special Committee on Inter-Korean Economic Cooperation, 20th National Assembly of Korea
2017 – 2018: Member, Education, Culture, Sports and Tourism Committee, 20th National Assembly of Korea
2017 – 2018: Member, Special Committee on Political Reform, 20th National Assembly of Korea
2017: Deputy director, Strategy Division, National Election Polling Committee for the 19th presidential Election, Democratic Party
2016 – 2017: Deputy floor leader of the Democratic party, the National Assembly
2016: Member, Special Committee on the Probe into the Alleged Manipulation of Government Affairs by President Park's Confidante Choi Soon-Sil and Other Private Citizens, National Assembly of Korea    
2013 – 2015: Visiting professor, East Asia International College, Yonsei University
2012 – Senior advisor to Moon Jae-in, Presidential Candidate
2010 – 2011: Professor, Graduate School of Social Policy, Gachon University
2006 – 2008: Visiting scholar, the East Asia Center, Cornell University
2003 – 2005: Secretary general, Forum of Democratic Leaders in the Asia-Pacific (FDL-AP)
2003 – 2005: Chief of staff to Kim Dae-jung, former president of Republic of Korea
2000 – Member of the delegation to the Inter-Korean Summit in 2000 (President Kim Dae-jung, Pyeong-yang)
1999 – 2003: Senior private secretary to President Kim Dae-jung 
1998 – 1999: Counsel to Director of National Intelligence Service for International Affairs (NIS)
1989 – 1992: Press secretary to Democratic Party chairperson Kim Dae-Jung for public relations

Awards 

2017: Awarded by the National Assembly Secretariat in 2016 as Distinguished Member of the National Assembly in Recognition of Excellence in Legislation and Policy Development
2017: Awarded as the Most Distinguished Member of the National Assembly in Recognition of Active Involvement in the National Assembly Library
2016: Awarded as Distinguished Democratic Party Member of the National Assembly in Recognition of Excellence in Parliamentary Audit
2016: Winner of the 4th Sunfull (meaning positive comments) Award for Member of the National Assembly in Recognition of Increasing the Practice of Posting Positive Messages Online

References

External links

South Korean politicians